Jedediah Herrick (January 9, 1780 – October 10, 1847, Hampden, Maine) was a general of the Massachusetts militia from 1816 to 1828, after distinguishing himself during the War of 1812. He had earlier served as high sheriff of Maine in 1806, before that territory had yet gained state status. He rose to the rank of major during the War of 1812.

1780 births
1847 deaths
American militiamen in the War of 1812
People from Hampden, Maine
American militia officers